Liquid Love may refer to:

 Liquid Love (Freddie Hubbard album), 1975
 Liquid Love (Shy Child album), 2010
 Liquid Love (book), a 2003 book by Zygmunt Bauman